Yves Jégo (born 17 April 1961) is a French former politician.  He was député for the third constituency of Seine-et-Marne in the National Assembly from 2002 to 2018, Mayor of Montereau-Fault-Yonne since 1995, and president of the Communauté de communes des Deux Fleuves.

He was the general delegate of the Union of Democrats and Independents, from the party's creation in October 2012. He was also vice president of the Radical Party. Jégo was the spokesman for the Union for a Popular Movement, when that party was ruling.  He is also founder and president of a local party Mieux Vivre Ensemble (MVE), formerly known as Mouvement des Seine-et-Marnais (MdSM). 

Jégo was appointed Secretary of State for Overseas in the government of François Fillon on 18 March 2008. He was therefore the Minister in charge of French Oversea territories during the 2009 French Caribbean protests and general strikes against high living costs and particularly the costs of food and fuel.  As he undertook the dismantling of monopolies, his role was the subject of controversy. He was replaced by Marie-Luce Penchard on 23 June 2009 and was not given another portfolio.

He announced in June 2018 that he would retire from politics and as a deputy in mid-July 2018. As of early 2023, he is the executive director (Délégué Général) of the Avec financial group, which is under investigation for alleged illegal asset stripping.

Political career

Governmental functions

Secretary of State for Overseas: 2008–2009.

Electoral mandates

While most members of the French parliament are also mayors or general (department) or regional councillor, Jégo is one of the few to cumulate three elected offices.

1. National Assembly of France

Member of the National Assembly of France for Seine-et-Marne (3rd constituency): 2002-2008 (Became secretary of State in 2008) / Again from 2009 to 2018. Elected in 2002, reelected in 2007 and 2012.

2. Municipal Council

Municipal councillor of Montereau-Fault-Yonne: Since 1989. Reelected in 1995, 2001, 2008.
Mayor of Montereau-Fault-Yonne: Since 1995. Reelected in 2001, 2008.

3. Community of communes Council

President of the Communauté de communes des Deux Fleuves: Since 2003. Reelected in 2008.

Regional Council

 Jégo has also been Regional councillor of Île-de-France: from March 2010 to his resignation in July 2011.

Accumulation of electoral mandates

According to French law against accumulation of electoral mandates, Jégo should have resigned from one of the three first mandates in this list before 21 April 2010. But giving as a pretext a legal complaint from the Front National's candidates, he still held the three of them, plus his local mandate of president of the « communauté de communes des deux fleuves » (CC2F) until his resignation from the Regional Council in July 2011.

In September 2011, Yves Jégo failed to become a member of the Senate of France.
In June 2012, he was re elected as a member of the National Assembly.

Voluntary associations
Yves Jégo is involved in a number of voluntary associations.
Co-founder and president of the multi-partisan association Entreprendre Villes et quartiers, devoted to the promotion of the French Zones Franches Urbaines (Urban Free Trade Zones) since 1996.
Founder and president since 2001 of the association la Seine en partage, devoted to the economical and cultural promotion of the Seine river.
Founder and president since 2006 of the Association Française d’Accession Populaire à la Propriété (AFAP)—formerly and briefly named Association des maisons à 100.000 euros. Its purpose is to help municipalities to build €100,000 houses and to sell them to lower-class households.

Professional experience
Development director of human resources management and recruitment firm, Light Consultant (1998–2002)
Co-founder of a publishing house, Éditions Timée (2000)
Co-founder of a publishing house, Squan Éditions (2008)
Lawyer (2010)

Executive director (Délégué Général) of the Avec financial group, which is under investigation for alleged illegal asset stripping.

Lawsuits for defamation and insult
An active blogger himself, Jégo sued two blogs for defamation and insult. In 2007, he sued Frédéric Maupin and Jean-Luc Pujo for calling him a "liar" and "manipulator" during the 2007 legislative campaign. His suit was dismissed in November 2007, and his subsequent appeal in July 2009 by the Paris appeal court.
In 2008, he similarly sued a local opponent, Yves Poey, for calling him an "apparatchik" and a "schemer" during the local elections campaign. Jégo won ) in March 2008 for "schemer", but Poey later won his appeal in May 2010.

References

1961 births
Living people
Politicians from Besançon
Radical Party (France) politicians
French Ministers of Overseas France
Mayors of places in Île-de-France
Debout la France politicians
Politicians of the French Fifth Republic
French bloggers
French city councillors
Local politicians in France
Paris 2 Panthéon-Assas University alumni
French male writers
Deputies of the 12th National Assembly of the French Fifth Republic
Deputies of the 13th National Assembly of the French Fifth Republic
Deputies of the 14th National Assembly of the French Fifth Republic
Deputies of the 15th National Assembly of the French Fifth Republic
Union of Democrats and Independents politicians
Male bloggers